The Coupe de France Final 1938 was a football match held at Parc des Princes, Paris on May 8, 1938, that saw Olympique de Marseille defeat FC Metz 2–1 thanks to goals by Vilmos Kohut and Emmanuel Aznar.

Match details

See also
Coupe de France 1937-1938

External links
Coupe de France results at Rec.Sport.Soccer Statistics Foundation
Report on French federation site

Coupe
1938
Coupe De France Final 1938
Coupe De France Final 1938
Coupe de France Final
Coupe de France Final